Aleksandr Komin (born 12 April 1995) is a Russian road cyclist, who currently rides Russian amateur team Samara Region.

Major results
2016
 1st Overall Penza Stage Race
1st Stages 1 & 3
 1st Stage 4 Udmurt Republic Stage Race
 3rd Criterium, National Road Championships
2017
 7th Overall Five Rings of Moscow
2018
 1st Stage 1 Samara Stage Race
 1st Stage 2 Izhevsk Stage Race
 3rd Overall Udmurt Republic Stage Race
1st Stage 2
2019
 7th Grand Prix Gazipasa
2020
 6th Grand Prix Manavgat–Side

References

External links

1995 births
Living people
Russian male cyclists
Sportspeople from Samara, Russia